The "Macedonian Orthodox Cathedral of the Dormition of the Virgin Mary" (Macedonian: Македонска Православна Kатедрала Успение на Пресвета Богородица), also known as "St. Mary" (Macedonian: Пресвета Богородица), is a Macedonian Orthodox Church located in Reynoldsburg, Ohio (Columbus area). It is one of the oldest Macedonian Orthodox communities in the United States and in the American-Canadian Diocese.

History
In 1958, the Macedonian Orthodox Church was granted her autonomy, and during the same year members of the Macedonian community of Columbus submitted an application to the State of Ohio to establish a new church under the jurisdiction of the autonomous Macedonian Orthodox Church. Early church trustees were Theodore Pashovich, Petar Christoff, and Velo Bozhin, with Andon Stoicheff as the first president of the Church Committee. The parish was organized on September 17, 1958 as the oldest parish of the Macedonian Orthodox Church in America. On December 25 the same year first Holy Liturgy in Macedonian conducted by Macedonian priest Fr. Stevan Beličeski was held in the Church Hall of the Society on 794 S Front Street, Columbus. In 1960, a property was purchased and the church building was finally completed in 1965. Few years later, on the corners of S. Napoleon Ave and Medway in Whitehall, OH the new cornerstone of the history of Macedonian Church and Community in Central Ohio was laid. Building of the Macedonian Orthodox Church “Dormition of the Most Holy Birth giver of God” started on August 30, 1964 with ever inspiring Faith and Hope and Love and Patience of hard working American-Macedonians. Next year 1965, on May 9, Church was dedicated and consecrated by the first Archbishop of the restored ancient Archbishopric of Ohrid in the name of the Macedonian Orthodox Church, His Beatitude Dositej.

The following 50 years paved the way to what the parish become today. Through numerous engagements in the Community, Macedonians in Central Ohio have integrated themselves in the American society. Numerous veterans from foreign wars, successful businessmen, sportsmen, and above all-hard working man and women from Macedonian-American Community are good example of that. 
In organizing and successfully conducting sports events, folk dances, Macedonian Language School, Sunday School, Church Choir etc., the impact of the Macedonian-American Community continues to grow.

Having broader family at some point of time requires broadening ones existing home or building another one. The family of the Macedonian Community in Columbus constantly grew in numbers and achievements. After several extensions of the Church and the Church hall in Whitehall in the seventies and eighties were completed, the need for more space rose again. Finally, decision to build the new Church and whole new Macedonian Culture Center was made. Beginning of the new century, the new Millennium marked the start of the new Church on 400 South Waggoner Rd in Reynoldsburg, OH. In 2003, the parish community purchased a new  property just east of Columbus in Reynoldsburg. A new church was built along with banquet hall facilities.

In the fall of 2006 Macedonian Community was struck by unexpected temptation-in an act of arson the old Church in Whitehall burnt almost to the ground. Following Holy Liturgies were held in the Church hall, with congregation holding their tears, in constant prayer to God our Lord and His Most Holy Mother, and in search for the right way to turn events in our favor. And so, as many times before in our history, Macedonians have sung their old song, song of persistence, song of salvation, song of Faith. 
The very next month after the fire, on October 22, 2006, the dedication and consecration Liturgy for our new Church was celebrated, preceded by the relocation of the holy relicts of Saint Clement of Ohrid, from the Holy Altar of the old to the Holy Altar of the new Church and with participation of Archbishop of Ohrid and Macedonia, His Beatitude Stefan, Metropolitan Metodij of American-Canadian Diocese, and Metropolitan Kiril of Polog and Kumanovo Diocese (of blessed memory), numerous priests of the American-Canadian Diocese of Macedonian Orthodox Church, in presence of multitude of the faithful.

Church name

The parish was consecrated as "Makedonska Pravoslavna Crkva Uspenie na Presveta Bogorodica" (Macedonian Cyrillic: Македонска Православна Црква „Успение на Пресвета Богородица“), in honor of the Great Feast of the Dormition of the Mother of God in the Eastern Orthodox Church. The feast commemorates the "falling asleep" or death of Mary, the Mother of Jesus (literally translated as God-bearer, or Birth-giver), and her bodily resurrection before being taken up into heaven. Roman Catholic churches also celebrate the Great Feast of the Assumption, which commemorates the same event from a Roman Catholic perspective.

Orthodox parishes named in honor of the Great Feast of the Dormition generally use a naming convention that contains either "Dormition of the Mother of God", "Dormition of the Theotokos" or "Dormition of the Virgin Mary" in their formal names. The Macedonian-language version of the parish name has always followed this naming convention, although throughout most of its history the parish was officially registered and known as the "St. Mary Macedonian American Eastern Orthodox Church". There are a total of four great feasts honoring the Mother of God in the Orthodox faith:  The Dormition, the Nativity of the Theotokos, the Presentation of the Theotokos, and the Annunciation. Because "St. Mary" can be used to represent any of the four feasts, it was felt that the existing name did not convey the correct meaning to the general public. For these reasons, the parish council voted to change the parish's corporate name so that it is consistent with accepted naming conventions. When the parish consecrated its new building in 2006, building signage was installed emphasizing the formal version of the parish name and reads "Macedonian Orthodox Cathedral of the Dormition of the Virgin Mary".

Parish members continue to refer to the parish using the "St. Mary" name because of sentimental reasons, its long history of use and ease of use. For these reasons, the building monument sign also contains a reference to "St. Mary". The parish also continues to maintain a registration for the former name.

Services and liturgy

The Parish belongs to Vicariate of the Mid West of the American-Canadian Macedonian Orthodox Diocese of the Macedonian Orthodox Church - Ohrid Archbishopric. Divine Liturgies are celebrated every Sunday, on the Twelve Great Feasts of the Orthodox Church and numerous Saints Feasts, as well as during the Holy Week (or Week of the Passions of Christ). Depending on what is prescribed by the Typicon, the Divine Liturgy of St. John Chrysostom, or Divine Liturgy of St. Basil the Great, or Liturgy of the Presanctified is celebrated. Macedonian Orthodox Church is following the Julian Calendar or so called Old Calendar, both in Macedonian and the Dioceses and parishes of the Diaspora. All Church services are presided and celebrated by the Dean of the cathedral, the Archpriest, Very Rev. Dusko Gorgievski (Протоереј-ставрофор Душан Ѓорѓиевски), Priest Fr. Radovan Cekovski, (Ереј Радован Цековски, since April 2017) and sub-decon Gorgi Gurcinovski (ипоѓакон Ѓорѓи Ѓурчиновски). The Divine Liturgy begins promptly at 10:30 AM and last until noon. All Church Services are chanted in the traditional Eastern Orthodox Church Chant (also known as "byzantine"). In addition to the service, a Sunday school is also provided. There, the priest gives a lesson on the Holy Scriptures or Holy Tradition topics every Sunday before he starts the service and from then on, the children will learn how to write and speak Macedonian for those who do not know how to.

Iconography and frescopainting

In the Fall of 2008, the parish began work on frescos that were to be painted on the interior sanctuary walls. The work was done by Archpriest Fr. Theodore Jurewicz, from Erie, Pennsylvania, priest of The Church of The Nativity of Christ, a parish of the Old Believers within the ROCOR (Russian Orthodox Church Outside Russia). He spent 6 weeks working on the Christ Pantocrator with the help of a group of helpers from Ohio, Oregon, Montana and few Romanian Orthodox nuns. Today, there is still much progress to be done, but inch by inch, the parish is covering the walls.

As of April 2013, Fr. Theodore has completed the eastern part of the church (including the whole Holy Altar area, main dome and the pandentifs), the entrance porch (so called exo-narthex) and one fresco composition on the western gallery, the one of the patron-feast "Dormition of the Most Holy Birth-giver of God" (donated by the youth organization-"Macedonian Orthodox Philanthropic Society of Columbus"-MOPS). In this, he has depicted many important and traditional frescos. For example, on the far wall of the altar is the most holy Theotokos, or the icon, Our Lady of the Sign also known as "more spacious than the heavens" (Greek: Πλατυτέρα των Ουρανών  [Platytera ton ouranon]). In addition to this, he has also depicted Feast of the Ascension and the Feast of the Pentecost (Descent of the Holy Spirit) is also depicted.
By the end of year 2016, the second phase of the fresco painting project was completed. This phase encompassed completion of all Lord's Feasts and the most important feasts of the Most Holy Birth-giver of God (Bogorodica): Exaltation of the Cross, Holy Transfiguration of Christ, Resurrection of Lazarus, Entry into Jerusalem (Palm Sunday), Holy Theophany (Baptism of Jesus by John in Jordan), Holy Resurrection (Descent in Hades-Easter), Protection of the Most Holy Birth-giver of God. In addition, Life of Holy Prophet John the Forerunner and Baptist and frescos of the Holy Seven Ecumenical Councils of the Orthodox Church were completed.
Third and last phase of the fresco painting project started in June 2017. So far, on the western wall under the Choir gallery, has been completed the fresco composition of the "End of the world", "The Second and Glorious Coming of Jesus Christ-The Awesome Judgement" and the so-called "The Rudder: The Mystical Ship of the Holy Orthodox Church, withstanding all prosecutions".
Fr. Theodore is the author of the completely all-new icons of the iconostasis.

See also
 Macedonian Americans

Footnotes

External links

Official Website of the American-Canadian Macedonian Orthodox Diocese
Official Website of the Macedonian Orthodox Church

Macedonian Orthodox churches in the United States
Macedonian Orthodox cathedrals
Eastern Orthodox churches in Ohio
1958 establishments in Ohio